The 1989 Midland Group Championships was a women's tennis tournament played on indoor carpet courts at the Brighton Centre in Brighton, England that was part of the 1989 WTA Tour. It was the 12th edition of the tournament and was held from 23 October until 29 October 1989. First-seeded Steffi Graf won the singles title, her third at the event after 1986 and 1988. She earned $50,000 first-prize money as well as 300 Virginia Slims ranking points.

Finals

Singles
 Steffi Graf defeated  Monica Seles 7–5, 6–4
 It was Graf's 13th singles title of the year and the 43rd of her career.

Doubles
 Katrina Adams /  Lori McNeil defeated  Hana Mandlíková /  Jana Novotná 4–6, 7–6(9–7), 6–4

Prize money and ranking points

References

External links
 International Tennis Federation (ITF) tournament event details
 Tournament draws

Midland Group Tennis Championships
Brighton International
Midland Group Tennis Championships
Midland Group Tennis Championships